Wayne Henry "Red" Williams Jr. (October 24, 1921 – August 18, 2001) was an American football player.  He played college football for the Minnesota Golden Gophers football team from 1942 to 1945. He led the NCAA major colleges in rushing yardage with 911 rushing yards in 1944. His 1944 average of 7.73 yards per carry and his career average 6.25 yards per carry during his career at Minnesota both remain Minnesota school records. With 1,999 rushing yards, he ranked second behind Pug Lund on Minnesota's career rushing record book at the time of his graduation. He died of congestive heart failure in 2001.

See also
 List of college football yearly rushing leaders

References

American football halfbacks
Minnesota Golden Gophers football players
Players of American football from Minnesota
1921 births
2001 deaths